Reg Stewart may refer to:

 Reg Stewart (footballer, born 1925) (1925–2011), English footballer for Sheffield Wednesday and Colchester United 
 Reg Stewart (Australian footballer) (1878–?), Australian rules footballer for St Kilda